The Society of Black Lawyers (SBL) was founded in the United Kingdom by Rudy Narayan in 1969, as the Afro-Asian and Caribbean Lawyers Association. By 1981, it was known as its current name. It was co-chaired by Narayan and Sibghat Kadri.

It aims to promote the rights and welfare of lawyers of colour, as well the rights of people of colour in the community who need legal protection or are facing harassment.

Since 1984, its chair has been Peter Herbert, a retired judge.

See also 
 National Conference of Black Lawyers (US)

Political blackness

References 

Law societies
Legal advocacy organizations